Sir John Alexander Armitt  (born 2 February 1946) is an English civil engineer, and current chairman of the UK's National Infrastructure Commission.

From 2007 Armitt was chairman of the Olympic Delivery Authority, the body which successfully built the venues, facilities and infrastructure for the 2012 Olympic Games. He was president of the Institution of Civil Engineers for 2015–16, and is president of the Smeatonian Society of Civil Engineers for 2022.

He was chairman of the Council of the City and Guilds of London Institute from 2012-2021, He was chairman of the Engineering and Physical Sciences Research Council from 2007 until 2012. He was chairman of National Express from January 2013 until December 2022.

Early life
Armitt was born in February 1946 in North London. He is 6 ft 4 in tall. He attended Portsmouth Northern Grammar School. He graduated in civil engineering from the Portsmouth College of Technology in 1966 and took his first job with John Laing.

Career
Armitt spent 27 years with John Laing, on various projects including the Sizewell B nuclear power station rising to become the chairman of Laing's International and Civil Engineering Divisions.

In 1993, he was appointed chief executive of Union Railways, the company responsible for implementing the Channel Tunnel rail link. From 1997 to 2001, he was chief executive of Costain Group, which he converted from an annual loss of £62 million to a profit of £6.5 million. In 2001 he became chief executive of Railtrack, and from 2002 to 2007 its successor, Network Rail,

During his time at Network Rail he was believed by a survey sponsored by The Sunday Times to be the highest-paid public-sector employee in the UK. Armitt's salary and bonus of £878,000 – rising to more than £1m when pension contributions are included, overtaking Adam Crozier, chief executive of Royal Mail.

On 2 November 2012 the Government announced that Armitt would be a member of the Airports Commission. He is a non executive director of the Berkeley Group and was a Transport for London board member from 2012 to 2016  

The Armitt Review, an independent review of long-term UK infrastructure planning, was published in September 2013, and is Labour Party policy. He was appointed to the National Infrastructure Commission in 2015, became Deputy Chairman in 2017 and was appointed Chairman in 2018. In January 2023, his appointment as chairman was renewed for a further two years, through to January 2025.

Also in January 2023, he was appointed as a non-executive director on the board of Tilbury Douglas's parent company, TD Bidco, owned and controlled by shareholders of Interserve.

Recognition
He was appointed Commander of the Order of the British Empire (CBE) in the 1996 Birthday Honours for services to the rail industry. On 16 July 2007 Network Rail named New Measurement Train power car 43062 after him at London Euston. He is a Fellow of the Royal Academy of Engineering and of the Institution of Civil Engineers.

He was knighted in the 2012 New Years Honours List for services to engineering and construction as chair of the Olympic Delivery Authority. His knighthood was criticised by the family of a victim of the Grayrigg derailment, as Armitt had been serving as chief executive of Network Rail at the time of the 2007 accident. Network Rail were prosecuted for the incident on the same day that Armitt's knighthood was conferred.

References

External links
 EPRSC
 London 2012
 John Armitt CBE FREng Ingenia, Issue 27, June 2006

        
        
        
        
        
        

1946 births
Living people
Alumni of the University of Portsmouth
Commanders of the Order of the British Empire
English civil engineers
Fellows of the Institution of Civil Engineers
Fellows of the Royal Academy of Engineering
Businesspeople from Portsmouth
Knights Bachelor
Engineers from Portsmouth
Presidents of the Institution of Civil Engineers
Presidents of the Smeatonian Society of Civil Engineers
20th-century British engineers
21st-century British engineers